This is a list of monuments in Kavrepalanchok District, Nepal as officially recognized by and available through the Department of Archaeology, Nepal.
Kavrepalanchok is a district of Bagmati Province and is located in central Nepal.

List of monuments

|}

See also
List of monuments in Nepal
List of monuments in Bagmati Province

References

Kavrepalanchok